Omophron nitidum, the shiny round sand beetle, is a species of ground beetle in the family Carabidae. It is found in North America within the United States, in areas such as Indiana, Minnesota, Nebraska, Alabama and Texas. Adults are nocturnal, spending their time in burrows and leaf litter during the day. The breeding of O. nitidum takes place from March to December.

References

Further reading

 
 
 
 
 
 

Carabidae
Beetles described in 1847